Hamadani, Hamedani or Hamadhani denotes something or someone related to the town of Hamadan in Iran, and may refer to:

Places
 Aghbolagh-e Hamadani, a village in Takab County, West Azerbaijan Province, Iran
 Tolombeh-ye Hamadani, a village in Rafsanjan County, Kerman Province, Iran
 Al-Hamadhani, a crater on planet Mercury

People 

 Hamadani, an Arabic nisbah (attributive title) that denotes an origin from Hamadan

Other
 Judeo-Hamedani dialect, spoken by Iranian Jews
 Maqamat Badi' az-Zaman al-Hamadhani, a 9th-century Arabic collection of stories

See also 
 Hamdani (disambiguation)